The 39th Indian Infantry Brigade was an infantry formation of the Indian Army during World War II.  It  was formed in September 1942, by the conversion of the HQ Ahwaz Line of Communications Sub-Area. The brigade served on Lines of Communication duties in Persia with the 12th Indian Infantry Division.

Formation
Bikanir Sadul Light Infantry May 1943 to October 1944
75th Cavalry Garrison Regiment, Indian Armoured Corps July 1943 to January 1945
1st Duke of York's Own Skinner's Horse August to December 1943
21st King George V's Own Horse August to December 1943
The Afridi Battalion January 1944 to January 1945
2nd Battalion, 6th Rajputana Rifles January to March 1944
25th Battalion, Sikh Light Infantry March 1944 to January 1945
Jodhpur Sardar Risala May 1944 to January 1945

See also

 List of Indian Army Brigades in World War II

References

British Indian Army brigades